Lukwago Rebecca Nalwanga is a Ugandan politician. She was the former female Member of Parliament in the eighth Parliament of Uganda representing Luweero District under the National Resistance Movement (NRM) political party.

Political life 
The former Luweero district Member of the Parliament asked for a cash bailout from the President Museveni to assist her in settling legal fees piled up from a host of court petitions she filed. She was as a result of  her 2011 election getting challenged  to the Parliament  by her political rivals.

Rebecca  requested that every one who aids in crime to be charged and brought to book. She added and emphasized the need to restore the public's trust in courts before they resort to mob justice. In 2014, she was reported to have been one of the five contestants from the NRM including Elizabeth Lugudde, Ramlah Kadala, Lilian Nakate, Jimiya Ssenkanja and Rita Mugalu who declared their interest in the MP seat.

See also 

 List of members of the eighth Parliament of Uganda

References 

Living people
Year of birth missing (living people)
People from Luweero District
National Resistance Movement politicians
Members of the Parliament of Uganda
Women members of the Parliament of Uganda